Spiraea douglasii is a species of flowering plant in the rose family native to western North America. Common names include hardhack, hardhack steeplebush, Douglas' spirea, douglasspirea, steeplebush, and rose spirea.

Description

They are alternately arranged, and the undersides are whitish with prominent veins. 

Large clusters of small, deep pink flowers form spires in early summer, later turning dark and persisting.

Distribution and habitat
The plant is native to western North America from Alaska across southwestern Canada and the Pacific Northwest. It has spread to many other places as an invasive species. It was introduced to Europe as early as 1803, and is considered to be especially invasive in Denmark and Latvia. It is also found in France, Ireland, Slovenia, Sweden, the United Kingdom, Belgium, Germany and Poland. 

It occurs most often in riparian habitat types, such as swamps, streambanks, bogs and mudflats. It grows best on moist or semiwet soils with good drainage. It tolerates a variety of soil types as well as gravelly substrates. 

Spirea is shade-intolerant, and therefore grows primarily in open marshes among sedges, horsetails, wild blueberries, and other swamp flora, as well as in seral communities.

Ecology 

Spirea foliage is browsed by black-tailed deer, but is not very palatable to livestock and only eaten by them occasionally.  The flowers provide nectar for hummingbirds, and small birds eat the seeds which persist into the winter when food is less plentiful.

Spirea provides nesting habitat for birds such as marsh wrens, and is a component of grizzly bear habitat.

It is moderately fire-resistant, as many of the marshes across its native range would historically dry up by midsummer and be susceptible to fire. If the above-ground portion of the plant is killed, it can sprout from the stem base or rhizomes after a wildfire.

It may hybridize with white spirea (S. betulifolia) to form pyramid spirea (S. x pyramidata Greene).

As an invasive species, the species decreases biodiversity, colonizing wetlands with dense monocultural thickets to the detriment of other plants.

Uses
Native Americans found used the plant for making brooms and hanging seafood to cook.

The plant is used as an ornamental in landscaping, where it grows best in sunny, moist places. Spirea is recommended for riparian revegetation projects in the Pacific Northwest, as it is hardy and grows quickly.

References

External links

Jepson Manual Treatment
Washington Burke Museum
Photo gallery

douglasii
Flora of the Northwestern United States